Sitalpati may refer to: 

Sitalpati, Sindhuli, Janakpur Zone, Nepal
Sitalpati, Sankhuwasabha, Nepal
Shital pati, a kind of mat used on beds in Bangladesh and India